Frank País Airport  is an airport serving Holguín, a city in the Cuban province of Holguín. It bears the name of Cuban revolutionary Frank País. The airport was built in 1962 initially only for military purposes before civilian air operations began in 1966. It consists of a domestic and an international terminal, which was built in 1996 and expanded in 2007.

History 
The aviation history of Holguín originates in a makeshift runway built near the Hill of the Cross in the city. Domingo Rosillo landed on this airstrip in 1914, one year after becoming the first pilot to fly between Key West and Havana. The first official airport serving Holguín was inaugurated on 30 October 1930. On this day, the airport served as one of several stops on the first airmail route in Cuba, between Havana and Santiago de Cuba. The airport was located in the neighbourhood of Peralta and named after mambí General Julio Grave de Peralta. However, because there was often dense fog at the airport, it closed a few years afterward; and operations moved to another site close to the location of the current airport.

In 1962, a military airbase was established on the outskirts of the city. Civilian air operations shifted to an area within the base on 10 November 1966, thus establishing Frank País Airport. As the tourism sector in Guardalavaca grew during the early 1990s, there was a need for a new international terminal, which was constructed in 1996 by Canadian infrastructure company Intelcan Technosystems. In 2007, the capacity of the terminal was doubled to 1,200 passengers per hour through a  expansion, which took one year to complete. Carried out to reduce congestion in the terminal during peak season, the expansion included additional customs facilities and a new VIP lounge. The inauguration of the expanded facilities was presided over by politician and then future president of Cuba, Miguel Díaz-Canel.

On 25 March 2020, it was announced that international flights from the airport were ceasing because of the coronavirus shutdown.  Flights began again on 3 November 2020, with three flights.

Infrastructure

Terminals
Frank País Airport has two terminals, one serving domestic flights and the other international flights. The international terminal can handle up to 1,200 passengers per hour and has various duty-free shops, restaurants and car rental agencies as well as a VIP lounge.

Airfield
Frank País Airport has a single runway, 05/23, which has dimensions  and is equipped with an instrument landing system. The apron in front of the passenger terminal has six parking stands.

Airlines and destinations

Military airbase
Built during the Cold War, the airbase is one of the most important in the country, housing large barracks and bunkers for fighter aircraft. The base is located on the north side of the airport and has its own apron.

Access
The beaches of the Costa Holguinera resort of Guardalavaca, Playa Esmeralda, Playa Pesquero, and Playa Blanca are situated at 1 hour travel and is a reason Canadian and European charters land here.

References

External links 

Airports in Cuba
Buildings and structures in Holguín
Buildings and structures in Holguín Province
Military history of Cuba
Airports established in 1962
1962 establishments in Cuba
20th-century architecture in Cuba